"I'm Lonely" is the fourth single from Scooter 2007 album, Jumping All Over The World.

The song was originally going to be released as the full third single in the UK as the follow-up to "Jumping All Over The World". The song's video received heavy play on Clubland TV and was popular on YouTube. However, the single only received a download-only release on 29 September 2008, to make way for the collaboration with Status Quo, "Jump That Rock (Whatever You Want)".

Track listings
CD Maxi
 "I'm Lonely (Radio Edit)" – (3:30)
 "I'm Lonely ('Dressed For Success' Club Mix)" – (5:00)
 "I'm Lonely (Extended)" – (5:53)
 "Way Up North" – (4:07)
 "I'm Lonely (The Video)" – 3:31
 "I'm Lonely (Making of)" – 3:17

CD Single
 "I'm Lonely (Radio Edit)" – (3:30)
 "I'm Lonely (Extended)" – (5:53)

12"
 "I'm Lonely (Extended)" – (5:53)
 "I'm Lonely ('Dressed For Success' Club Mix)" – (5:00)

Download
 "I'm Lonely (Radio Edit)" – (3:30)
 "I'm Lonely ('Dressed For Success' Club Mix)" – (5:00)
 "I'm Lonely (Extended)" – (5:53)
 "Way Up North" – (4:07)

UK Promo CD Maxi
 "I'm Lonely (Radio Edit)" – 3:32
 "I'm Lonely (Extended Mix)" – 5:54
 "I'm Lonely (Styles & Breeze Remix)" – 6:16
 "I'm Lonely (Flip & Fill Remix)" – 6:11
 "I'm Lonely (Alex K Remix)" – 7:35
 "I'm Lonely ('Dressed For Success' Club Mix)" – 5:00

UK Download
 "I'm Lonely (Radio Edit)" – (3:30)
 "I'm Lonely (Extended)" – (5:52)
 "I'm Lonely ('Dressed For Success' Club Mix)" – (4:59)
 "Way Up North" – (4:05)

Charts

Samples 
 "I'm Lonely" samples the songs "Lonely" by Felix Project (official sample) and "Fly Away" by Vincent de Moor (unofficial sample).

References 

2008 singles
Scooter (band) songs
Jumpstyle songs
Songs written by H.P. Baxxter
Songs written by Rick J. Jordan
Songs written by Jens Thele
Songs written by Michael Simon (DJ)
2007 songs